Nils Svante Granholm (born 15 March 1947) is a Swedish former ice hockey forward and Olympian.

Granholm played with Team Sweden at the 1968 Winter Olympics held in Grenoble, France. He previously played for Frölunda HC and Timrå IK in the Swedish Elite League.

References

1947 births
Living people
Ice hockey players at the 1968 Winter Olympics
Olympic ice hockey players of Sweden
Swedish ice hockey forwards
People from Sundsvall
Sportspeople from Västernorrland County